Truganina Rabbitohs Rugby League Club are an Australian rugby league football club based in Truganina, Victoria formed in late 2015. They conduct teams for both junior and senior teams.

See also

Rugby league in Victoria
List of sports clubs inspired by others

References

External links
Truganina Rabbitohs Fox Sports pulse

Rugby league clubs in Melbourne
Rugby league teams in Victoria (Australia)
Rugby clubs established in 2015
2015 establishments in Australia
Sport in the City of Melton